The Pangduo Hydro Power Station (also called the Pondo Hydro Power Station) is a reservoir and dam on the Lhasa River in Lhünzhub County to the east of Lhasa, Tibet Autonomous Region, China. The primary purposes are hydroelectric power generation and agricultural irrigation. Work started in 2008. The first turbine came into production in 2013 and the other three turbines in 2014. With annual generation capacity of 599 million kilowatt hours, it has been called the "Tibetan Three Gorges".  Nevertheless, the comparison is hyperbole since the dam is only able to impound less than 1/30th that of Three Gorges.(31.9 vs 0.97 million acre-feet).

Description

The objectives included hydroelectric power generation, irrigation, flood prevention and water supply.
Of these, power generation and irrigation are the main purposes.
The dam is one of a series that China has built on the Brahmaputra and its tributaries, others being the Yamdrok Hydropower Station, Nyingtri-Payi and Drikong.

The rock-fill dam impounds  of water.
It is planned to irrigate  of agricultural land.
The power station has total installed capacity of 160 MW, with four generating units.
The potential annual generating capacity is 599 GWh (million kilowatt hours).

Construction

The project involved a total investment of 4.569 billion yuan, or about 740 million US dollars, and has been called the "Tibetan Three Gorges". 
The dam and power station were built as part of the Western Development Strategy.
Work started in 2008, and progressed on schedule.
Damming of the river stream was completed in October 2011.
Construction of the wall was challenging, with glacial sediments underlying flood sediments.

The project was due to start operating its first generator in October 2013.
The first generator set was supported by a computer monitoring system developed by the Beijing-based Institute of Water resources and Hydropower Research.
The first generating unit started operation in December 2013, with annual generation capacity of 150 million kilowatt hours. 
The other three units were expected to come onstream in June 2014, bringing annual capacity to the total of 599 million kilowatt hours.
Construction is expected to be completed in 2016.

References

Sources

Reservoirs and dams in Tibet
Dams in the Brahmaputra River Basin
Buildings and structures in Lhasa
Lhünzhub County
Dams in China
Hydroelectric power stations in Tibet
Dams completed in 2013
2013 establishments in China
Rock-filled dams
Energy infrastructure completed in 2013